Lausenbach is a river located in Bavaria, Germany. It flows into the Ohře (Eger) near Selb.

See also
List of rivers of Bavaria

Rivers of Bavaria
Rivers of Germany